Dryburgh is the name of a district of Dundee, Scotland, home to The View.  The band featured locations throughout the area in their video for their 2006 track Superstar Tradesman. The Dryburgh estate has been used for the band's 2007 videos for Skag Trendy and The Don. These videos also feature areas of Lochee near Dryburgh, in particular 'Davies' cafe in Lochee high street.

Dryburgh is home to one of Dundee's longest running boys football clubs "Dryburgh Athletic"

The local store is nicknamed 'Chiefs' and is right next door to the 'Yummy Yummy' Chinese Takeaway.

Areas of Dundee